Lee Konitz at Storyville (also known as Jazz at Storyville) is a live album by saxophonist Lee Konitz featuring performances recorded at the Storyville nightclub in Boston and which was originally released as a 10-inch LP on George Wein's Storyville label. It was recorded on January 5, 1954.

Reception

On Allmusic, Scott Yanow wrote "This excellent set gives one a definitive look at altoist Lee Konitz at a period of time when he was breaking away from being a sideman and a student of Lennie Tristano and asserting himself as a leader. With pianist Ronnie Ball, bassist Percy Heath, and drummer Alan Levitt, Konitz explores a variety of his favorite chord changes, some of which were disguised by newer melodies".

Track listing
All compositions by Lee Konitz except where noted
 Introduction by John McLelland – 0:52 Additional track on reissue
 "Hi Beck" – 7:38
 "If I Had You" (Irving King, Ted Shapiro) – 11:19 Additional track on reissue
 "Subconscious Lee" – 5:34
 "Sound Lee" – 6:39	
 "Foolin' Myself" (Jack Lawrence, Peter Tinturin) – 6:01 Additional track on reissue
 Introduction by John McLelland – 0:45 Additional track on reissue
 "Ablution" – 4:43 Additional track on reissue
 "These Foolish Things" (Harry Link, Holt Marvell, Jack Strachey) – 4:09
 End Announcement by John McLelland – 0:39 Additional track on reissue

Personnel
Lee Konitz – alto saxophone
Ronnie Ball – piano
Percy Heath – bass
Al Levitt – drums

References

Lee Konitz live albums
1954 live albums
Storyville Records (George Wein's) live albums
Black Lion Records live albums